Film & History: An Interdisciplinary Journal is a peer-reviewed academic journal founded in 1970 and dedicated to the interdisciplinary study of film, television, and other moving-image arts. It is currently hosted by Lawrence University (Appleton, WI). The editor-in-chief is Loren P. Q. Baybrook. The journal is affiliated with the American Historical Association.

Additionally, the journal hosts an international scholarly conference in the autumn of each year.

See also
 List of film periodicals

External links

Film & History at Project MUSE

Publications established in 1970
Media studies journals
English-language journals
Biannual journals